File:Ground floor concert hall.jpg
The Town of Boulder was a local government area in Western Australia, centred on the town of Boulder.

It was established as the Municipality of Boulder on 6 August 1897. It was given town status as the Town of Boulder on 1 July 1961.

The municipality was responsible for the construction of the Boulder Town Hall as its new headquarters in 1907-08.

It ceased to exist on 1 July 1969, when it was absorbed into the neighbouring Shire of Kalgoorlie, which was subsequently renamed the Shire of Boulder in November that year.

Graph of related authorities

Mayors

The following people served as mayors of the council:

 John Marquis Hopkins (1897-1900)
 James Albert Hopkins (1900-1902)
 William Thomas Rabbish (1902-1905)
 James Lyon Johnston (1905-1908)
 John Mills Waddell (1908-1909)
 Charles Robert Davies OBE (1909-1912)
 Henry Glance (1912-1915)
 Stephen Beston (1915-1919)
 James Albert Rogers (1919-1922)
 George Henry Rainsford (1922-1928)
 Walter Forrester Coath (1928-1944)
 John Denis Teahan (1944-1954)
 John Michael Adrenne Cunningham (1954-1955)
 Arthur Alexander James Gillespie (1955-1968)
 Adam Altham (1968-1969)

References

Former local government areas of Goldfields-Esperance region of Western Australia
City of Kalgoorlie–Boulder